The Circuito de Getxo is a single-day road bicycle race held annually in July in Getxo, Spain. Since 2005, the race is organised as a 1.1 event on the UCI Europe Tour.

Established in 1924 as Circuito de Getxo, since 2001 it is also held as Memorial Ricardo Otxoa in memory of former cyclist Ricardo Otxoa, who died after a car hit him and his twin brother, Javier in early 2001.

Winners

References

External links

UCI Europe Tour races
Cycle races in the Basque Country
Recurring sporting events established in 1924
1924 establishments in Spain